Cantar is the fifth solo album by the Brazilian singer Gal Costa, released in 1974. It was ranked the 91st best Brazilian album of all time by the Brazilian Rolling Stone magazine.

Track listing

References 

1974 albums
Gal Costa albums
Portuguese-language albums
Albums produced by Caetano Veloso